An aviation accident is defined by the Convention on International Civil Aviation Annex 13 as an occurrence associated with the operation of an aircraft, which takes place from the time any person boards the aircraft with the intention of flight until all such persons have disembarked, and in which a) a person is fatally or seriously injured, b) the aircraft sustains significant damage or structural failure, or c) the aircraft goes missing or becomes completely inaccessible.  Annex 13 defines an aviation incident as an occurrence, other than an accident, associated with the operation of an aircraft that affects or could affect the safety of operation.

A hull loss occurs if an aircraft is damaged beyond repair, lost, or becomes completely inaccessible.

The first fatal aviation accident was the crash of a Rozière balloon near Wimereux, France, on June 15, 1785, killing the balloon's inventor, Jean-François Pilâtre de Rozier, and the other occupant, Pierre Romain. The first involving a powered aircraft was the crash of a Wright Model A aircraft at Fort Myer, Virginia, in the United States on September 17, 1908, injuring its co-inventor and pilot, Orville Wright, and killing the passenger, Signal Corps Lieutenant Thomas Selfridge.

Major disasters 
The first aircraft accident in which 200 or more people died occurred on March 3, 1974, when 346 died in the crash of Turkish Airlines Flight 981. , there have been 33 aviation incidents in which 200 or more people died.

The top 10 countries with the highest number of fatal civil airliner accidents from 1945 to 2021 are the United States, Russia, Canada, Brazil, Colombia, United Kingdom, France, Indonesia, Mexico, and India. The United Kingdom is noted to have the highest number of air crashes in Europe, with a total of 110 air crashes within the time period, and Indonesia is the highest in Asia at 104, followed by India at 95.

The largest loss of life on board a single-aircraft is the 520 fatalities in the 1985 Japan Airlines Flight 123 accident, the largest loss of life in multiple aircraft in a single accident is the 583 fatalities in the two Boeing 747's that collided in the 1977 Tenerife airport disaster, while the largest loss of life overall in a collective incident is the 2,996 fatalities in the coordinated terrorist destruction of airplanes and occupied buildings in the 2001 September 11 attacks.

September 11 attacks 

2,996: The deadliest aviation-related disaster, regarding fatalities on both the aircraft and the ground, was the destruction of the World Trade Center in New York City on September 11, 2001. On that morning, four commercial jet airliners traveling on transcontinental flights from East Coast airports to California were hijacked after takeoff. The four hijacked aircraft were subsequently crashed in a series of four coordinated suicide attacks against major American landmarks by 19 Islamic terrorists affiliated with Al-Qaeda. American Airlines Flight 11 and United Airlines Flight 175 were intentionally crashed into the North and South Towers of the World Trade Center, respectively, destroying both buildings in less than two hours. The World Trade Center crashes killed 2,753, the vast majority of fatalities being occupants of the two towers or emergency personnel responding to the disaster. In addition, 184 were killed by the impact of American Airlines Flight 77, which crashed into the Pentagon in Arlington, Virginia, causing severe damage and partial destruction to the building's west side. The crash of United Airlines Flight 93 into a field in Somerset County, Pennsylvania, which occurred as passengers attempted to retake control of the aircraft from the hijackers, killed all 40 passengers and crew aboard the aircraft. This brought the total number of casualties of the September 11 attacks to 2,996 (including the 19 terrorist hijackers). As deliberate terrorist acts, the 9/11 crashes were not classified as accidents, but as mass-killing. The events were treated by the United States and the member nations of NATO as an act of war and terrorism. The war on terror was subsequently launched by the United States and NATO in response to the attacks, leading to the death of Al-Qaeda leader Osama Bin Laden, who had ordered the 9/11 attacks.

Tenerife disaster 

583: The Tenerife airport disaster, which occurred on March 27, 1977, remains the accident with the highest number of airliner passenger fatalities. 583 people died when a KLM Boeing 747 attempted to take off and collided with a taxiing Pan Am 747 at Los Rodeos Airport on the Canary Island of Tenerife, Spain. All 234 passengers and 14 crew of the KLM aircraft died and 61 of the 396 passengers and crew of the Pan Am aircraft survived. Pilot error was the primary cause, as the KLM captain began his takeoff run in the mistaken belief he had obtained air traffic control clearance. Other contributing factors were a terrorist incident at Gran Canaria Airport that had caused many flights to be diverted to Los Rodeos, a small airport not well equipped to handle aircraft of such size, and dense fog. The KLM flight crew could not see the Pan Am aircraft on the runway until immediately before the collision. The accident had a lasting influence on the industry, particularly in the area of communication. An increased emphasis was placed on using standardized phraseology in air traffic control (ATC) communication by both controllers and pilots alike. "Cockpit Resource Management"  has also been incorporated into flight crew training. The captain is no longer considered infallible, and combined crew input is encouraged during aircraft operations.

Japan Air Lines Flight 123 

520: The crash of Japan Airlines Flight 123 on August 12, 1985, has the highest number of fatalities for any single-aircraft accident: 520 people died onboard a Boeing 747. The aircraft suffered an explosive decompression from an incorrectly repaired aft pressure bulkhead, which failed in mid-flight, destroying most of its vertical stabilizer and severing all of the hydraulic lines, making the 747 virtually uncontrollable. Pilots were able to keep the plane flying for 32 minutes after the mechanical failure before crashing into a mountain. All 15 crew members and 505 of the 509 passengers on board died. Japanese military personnel inaccurately assumed, during a helicopter flyover of the impact site, that there were no survivors. Rescue operations were delayed until the following morning. Medical providers involved in rescue and analysis operations determined that several passengers likely survived the impact and probably would have survived the incident had rescue operations not been delayed. Four passengers survived the incident in its entirety, meaning that they were alive when discharged from the hospital.

Other crashes with death tolls of 200 or higher 

349: On November 12, 1996, the Charkhi Dadri mid-air collision took place between Saudia Flight 763 and Kazakhstan Airlines Flight 1907 over Charkhi Dadri, India. The collision was mainly the result of the Kazakh pilot flying lower than the assigned clearance altitude. All 349 passengers and crew on board the two aircraft died. It remains the world's deadliest mid-air collision. The Ramesh Chandra Lahoti Commission, empowered to study the causes, recommended the creation of the "semi-circular rule", to prevent aircraft from flying in opposite directions at the same altitude. The Civil Aviation Authorities in India made it mandatory for all aircraft flying in and out of India to be equipped with a Traffic Collision Avoidance System (TCAS), setting a worldwide precedent for mandatory use of TCAS.

346: On March 3, 1974, Turkish Airlines Flight 981, a McDonnell Douglas DC-10, crashed in a forest northeast of Paris, France. The London-bound plane crashed shortly after taking off from Orly airport; all 346 people on board died. It was later determined that the cargo door detached, which caused an explosive decompression; this caused the floor just above to collapse. The collapsed floor severed the control cables, which left the pilots without control of the elevators, the rudder and No. 2 engine. The plane entered a steep dive and crashed. It was the deadliest plane crash of all time until the Tenerife disaster in 1977. It is currently the deadliest single-aircraft crash with no survivors.

329: On June 23, 1985, Air India Flight 182, a Boeing 747-237B en route from Toronto and Montreal to London and Delhi, crashed off the southwest coast of Ireland when a bomb exploded in the cargo hold. All 307 passengers and 22 crew members died. One passenger had checked in as "M. Singh". Singh did not board the flight. His suitcase containing the bomb was loaded onto the plane, however. "M. Singh" was never identified or captured. It was later determined Sikh extremists were behind the bombing as a retaliation for the Indian government's attack on the Golden Temple in the city of Amritsar, spiritually the most significant shrine in Sikhism. This was, at the time, the deadliest terrorist attack involving an airplane.

301: On August 19, 1980, Saudi Arabian Airlines Flight 163, a Lockheed L-1011, became the world's deadliest aviation accident that did not involve a crash. The crew performed an emergency landing at Riyadh after a fire broke out in an aft baggage compartment. The fire burned through the ceiling of the compartment and into the passenger cabin. While the crew managed to land the plane safely, the captain did not stop immediately and order an evacuation. He taxied off the runway instead, by which time everyone in the cabin had become unconscious due to fumes and unable to open any doors or evacuate. All 301 passengers and crew died of suffocation before rescue ground crews could open any door, after which the aircraft burst into flames and was consumed by fire.

298: On July 17, 2014, Malaysia Airlines Flight 17, a Boeing 777-200ER, flying from Amsterdam to Kuala Lumpur, was shot down in an area of Eastern Ukraine near the Ukraine/Russian border during the war in Donbas. There were 298 people on board—283 passengers, and 15 crew members—all of whom perished. The crew were all Malaysians, while the passengers were of various nationalities, most from the Netherlands. Several Ukrainian Air Force (UAF) aircraft had been shot down over the rebel-controlled territory before the MH17 incident. Immediately after the crash, a post appeared on the VKontakte social media profile attributed to Igor Girkin, leader of the Donbas separatist militia, claiming responsibility for shooting down a Ukrainian An-26 military transporter near Torez. The post was removed later the same day, and the separatists then denied shooting down any aircraft.

290: On July 3, 1988, Iran Air Flight 655, an Iranian civilian Airbus A300-200 airliner, was shot down by two surface-to-air missiles from the U.S. Navy guided missile cruiser USS Vincennes over the Strait of Hormuz. All 290 passengers and crew aboard the aircraft died. The rationale for the downing is still unclear.

275: On February 19, 2003, an Iranian military Ilyushin Il-76 crashed in mountainous terrain near Kerman in Iran. The official report says bad weather brought the aircraft down; high winds and fog were present at the time of the crash.

273: On May 25, 1979, American Airlines Flight 191, a McDonnell Douglas DC-10-10, crashed shortly after lifting off the runway at Chicago O'Hare Airport after the number one (left) engine and pylon separated from the wing. This broke hydraulic lines, causing leading edge lift devices to retract on that side of the aircraft and resulted in asymmetrical lift and loss of control. The accident was attributed to improper maintenance procedures. The crash resulted in the deaths of all 271 passengers and crew on board, as well as two people on the ground. It remains the deadliest commercial aircraft accident in United States history, and was also the country's deadliest aviation disaster until the September 11 attacks in 2001.

270: On December 21, 1988, Pan Am Flight 103, a Boeing 747-121 bound for New York–JFK from London–Heathrow with continued service to Detroit, was destroyed by a terrorist bomb over the town of Lockerbie, Scotland. All 243 passengers and 16 crew, and 11 people on the ground (all residents of Sherwood Crescent, Lockerbie), died,
making it the worst terrorist attack involving an aircraft in the UK and the deadliest terrorist attack on British soil. Following the crash, the Federal Aviation Administration imposed new security measures on American airlines flying out of 103 airports in Western Europe and the Middle East.

269: On September 1, 1983, a Soviet interceptor Sukhoi Su-15 shot down Korean Air Lines Flight 007, a Boeing 747-230B, bound for Gimpo International Airport in Seoul, South Korea, after it flew into Soviet airspace; all 269 passengers and crew on board died.

265: On November 12, 2001, American Airlines Flight 587, an Airbus A300, crashed in the Belle Harbor neighborhood of Queens, New York, just after departing John F. Kennedy International Airport bound for Las Américas International Airport, Santo Domingo.  The first officer's overuse of the rudder in response to wake turbulence from a Japan Airlines 747 was cited as cause. All 260 people on board, as well as five people on the ground, died from the crash. It is the second-deadliest aviation accident on U.S. soil, after American Airlines Flight 191.

264: On April 26, 1994, China Airlines Flight 140 was completing a routine flight and approach at Nagoya Airport, Japan, when the Airbus A300B4-622R's First Officer inadvertently pressed the takeoff/go-around button, which raises the throttle position to the same as take offs and go-arounds.  The action and the two pilots' reaction resulted in a crash that killed 264 (15 crew and 249 passengers) of the 271 people aboard.

261: On July 11, 1991, Nigeria Airways Flight 2120, a Douglas DC-8-61 aircraft operated by Nationair Canada, crashed in Jeddah, Saudi Arabia, after two tires ignited upon takeoff, leading to an in-flight fire. All 247 passengers and 14 crew members were killed. It is the deadliest aviation accident involving a DC-8, the largest aviation disaster involving a Canadian-registered aircraft and the second-worst accident in Saudi Arabia (after Saudi Arabian Airlines Flight 163 - see above).

257: On April 11, 2018, an Algerian Air Force transport plane crashed shortly after take-off from Boufarik Airport, killing all 247 passengers and 10 crew on board the Ilyushin Il-76.

257: On November 28, 1979, Air New Zealand Flight 901, an Antarctic sightseeing flight, collided with Mount Erebus on Ross Island, Antarctica, killing all 237 passengers and 20 crew on board.  The flight crew had not been informed that the computer coordinates for the flight path of the McDonnell Douglas DC-10-30 had been changed the night before, directing the flight directly into Mount Erebus rather than the usual path down McMurdo Sound.

256: On December 12, 1985, a Douglas DC-8, Arrow Air Flight 1285, carrying American military personnel on a charter flight home for Christmas, crashed in Newfoundland; all 248 passengers and eight crew members died. The Canadian Aviation Safety Board investigating the cause of the crash issued two different reports: the majority report cited ice on the wings as cause of the crash; the minority report suggests an explosion was the likely cause.

239: On March 8, 2014, a Boeing 777-200ER, Malaysia Airlines Flight 370, flying from Kuala Lumpur, Malaysia, to Beijing, China, lost contact with air traffic controllers over the South China Sea, deviated from its planned route, and was presumed lost in the southern Indian Ocean. It carried 12 Malaysian crew members and 227 passengers from 15 nations, who are all presumed dead. A multinational search effort, the most extensive and expensive in aviation history, has thus far failed to locate the aircraft, though debris from the aircraft has been recovered from beaches around the Indian Ocean. Numerous theories have been offered to explain the disappearance of the flight, but none have been confirmed.

234: On September 26, 1997, an Airbus A300B4-220, Garuda Indonesia Flight 152, which departed from Jakarta, Indonesia, and was preparing to land at Medan, North Sumatra, crashed into mountainous terrain, killing 222 passengers and 12 crew members. The causes included turning left instead of right as instructed by ATC and descending below the assigned altitude of 2,000 feet due to pilot error. It is the deadliest aviation disaster in Indonesia's history.

230: On July 17, 1996, a Boeing 747-131, TWA Flight 800, carrying 212 passengers and 18 crew, exploded and crashed into the Atlantic Ocean near East Moriches, New York, shortly after departing from John F. Kennedy International Airport on a flight to Paris and Rome. A lengthy investigation concluded that the probable cause of the accident was a short circuit in a fuel tank that contained an explosive mixture of fuel vapor and air. As a result, new requirements were developed to prevent future fuel tank explosions in aircraft.

229: On September 2, 1998, a McDonnell Douglas MD-11, Swissair Flight 111, carrying 215 passengers and 14 crew from New York City to Geneva, Switzerland, crashed into the Atlantic Ocean near Halifax, Nova Scotia, Canada, killing all aboard. After a lengthy investigation, an official report stated that flammable material used in the aircraft's structure, specifically the Personal TV Systems recently installed in the Business Class Cabin, allowed a fire to spread, resulting in a loss of control.

228: On June 1, 2009, an Airbus A330-203, Air France Flight 447, carrying 216 passengers and 12 crew, was en route from Rio de Janeiro, Brazil to Paris, France, when it crashed into the Atlantic Ocean. The aircraft's flight recorders were not recovered from the ocean floor until May 2011, and the final investigative report was released in July 2012. It determined that the disaster was likely due to the aircraft's pitot tubes being obstructed by ice crystals, causing the autopilot to disconnect. The crew reacted incorrectly, leading to an aerodynamic stall from which the jet did not recover.

228: On August 6, 1997, a Boeing 747-3B5, Korean Air Flight 801, crashed on approach to the international airport in the United States territory of Guam, killing 228 of the 254 people aboard. Contributing factors in the crash were fatigue and errors by the flight crew, inadequate flight crew training, and a modification of the airport's altitude warning system that prevented it from detecting aircraft below a minimum safe altitude.

227: On January 8, 1996, an Antonov An-32B aircraft with six crew members on board overshot the runway at N'Dolo Airport, Kinshasa, Democratic Republic of Congo, and plowed into a market place. Four on board survived but 225 people on the ground were killed and an estimated 500 were injured (estimated 253 seriously injured). It is the crash with the most non-passenger ground fatalities (not including 9/11). It is usually known as the 1996 Air Africa crash.

225: On May 25, 2002, a Boeing 747-209B, China Airlines Flight 611, bound for Hong Kong International Airport in Hong Kong, disintegrated in mid-air and crashed into the Taiwan Strait 20 minutes after takeoff from Chiang Kai-shek International Airport (now Taiwan Taoyuan International Airport) in Taiwan. It was determined that the crash, which killed all 206 passengers and 19 crew members aboard the plane, was caused by improper repairs to the aircraft 22 years earlier when the aircraft encountered a tailstrike.

224: On October 31, 2015, an Airbus A321-231, Metrojet Flight 9268, crashed in the Sinai Peninsula after departing Sharm el-Sheikh International Airport, Egypt, en route to Pulkovo Airport, Saint Petersburg, Russia. All 217 passengers and seven crew members were killed. A branch of the Islamic State of Iraq and the Levant claimed responsibility for bringing down the jet, and a Russian investigation concluded that a bomb was detonated inside the plane at a high altitude.

223: On May 26, 1991, a Boeing 767-3Z9ER, Lauda Air Flight 004, broke up in midair over a remote area of Thailand due to an uncommanded deployment of a thrust reverser on one of the plane's engines, killing all 213 passengers and 10 crewmembers aboard. The flight, which originated at Kai Tak Airport, Hong Kong, and made a stopover at Don Mueang International Airport in Bangkok, Thailand, was en route to Vienna International Airport, Vienna, Austria, when the accident occurred.

217: On October 31, 1999, a Boeing 767-366ER, EgyptAir Flight 990, flying from Los Angeles International Airport, United States, to Cairo International Airport, Egypt, with a stop at John F. Kennedy International Airport, New York City, crashed into the Atlantic Ocean south of Nantucket Island, Massachusetts, killing all 203 passengers and 14 crewmembers. The National Transportation Safety Board determined that the probable cause of the crash was deliberate action by the relief first officer in response to his removal from international service within Egyptair, a finding disputed by Egyptian authorities who maintain another cause of the accident.

213: On January 1, 1978, a Boeing 747-237B, Air India Flight 855, crashed into the Arabian Sea just off the coast of Bombay, India, killing all 190 passengers and 23 crew on board. An investigation concluded that the captain became disoriented after the failure of one of the flight instruments in the cockpit, leading to "irrational control inputs" that caused the plane to crash.

203: On February 16, 1998, an Airbus A300B4-622R, China Airlines Flight 676, en route from Ngurah Rai Airport in Bali, Indonesia, to Chiang Kai-shek International Airport (now Taoyuan International Airport), Taiwan, crashed into a road and residential neighborhood in Taoyuan, Taiwan, killing 182 passengers, 14 crew, and seven people on the ground. An investigation determined that when the control tower ordered the pilot to abort his landing and "go around" for a second attempt, the pilot, who had unintentionally released the plane's autopilot, did nothing to take control of the plane for 11 seconds as he apparently thought the autopilot would initiate the go around. As the aircraft approached the airport, the pilot executed a sudden steep ascent that produced a stall and crash. China Airlines was also criticized for "insufficient training."

200: On July 10, 1985, a Tupolev Tu-154B-2, Aeroflot Flight 7425, on a domestic Karshi–Ufa–Leningrad route, crashed near Uchkuduk, Uzbek SSR, Soviet Union, on the first leg of its route. All 191 passengers and nine crew were killed. An investigation concluded that the plane went down due to pilot error. The air crew used an inappropriately low airspeed, causing vibrations that they incorrectly interpreted as engine surges. As a result, they further reduced engine power, causing the aircraft to stall and crash.

Safety 

In over one hundred years of implementation, aviation safety has improved considerably. In modern times, two major manufacturers still produce heavy passenger aircraft for the civilian market: Boeing in the United States, and the European company Airbus. Both of these manufacturers place a huge emphasis on the use of aviation safety equipment, now a billion-dollar industry in its own right; safety is a key selling point for these companies, as they recognize that a poor safety record in the aviation industry is a threat to corporate survival.

Some major safety devices now required in commercial aircraft are:
 Evacuation slides, to aid rapid passenger exit from an aircraft in an emergency situation
 Advanced avionics, incorporating computerized auto-recovery and alert systems
 Turbine engines with improved durability and failure containment mechanisms
 Landing gear that can be lowered even after loss of power and hydraulics

Measured on a passenger-distance calculation, air travel is the safest form of transportation available: Figures mentioned are the ones shared by the air industry when quoting air safety statistics. A typical statement, e.g., by the BBC: "UK airline operations are among the safest anywhere. When compared against all other modes of transport on a fatality per mile basis, air transport is the safest – six times safer than travelling by car and twice as safe as rail."

When measured by fatalities per person transported, however, buses are the safest form of transportation. The number of air travel fatalities per person is surpassed only by bicycles and motorcycles. This statistic is used by the insurance industry when calculating insurance rates for air travel.

For every billion kilometers traveled, trains have a fatality rate that is 12 times higher than that of air travel, and the fatality rate for automobiles is 62 times greater than for air travel. By contrast, for every billion journeys taken, buses are the safest form of transportation; using this measure, air travel is three times more dangerous than car transportation, and almost 30 times more dangerous than travelling by bus.

A 2007 study by Popular Mechanics magazine found that passengers sitting at the back of an aeroplane are 40% more likely to survive a crash than those sitting at the front. The article quotes Boeing, the FAA, and a website on aircraft safety, all of which claim that there is no "safest" seat. The study examined 20 crashes, not taking into account the developments in safety after those accidents. However, a flight data recorder is usually mounted in the aircraft's empennage (tail section) where it is more likely to survive a severe crash.

Between 1983 and 2000, the survival rate for people in U.S. plane crashes was greater than 95 percent.

Global Aeronautical Distress and Safety System
In an effort to prevent incidents such as the disappearance of Malaysia Airlines Flight MH370, a new standard has been issued requiring all commercial aircraft to report their position every 15 minutes to air traffic controllers regardless of the country of origin. Introduced in 2016 by the ICAO, the regulation has no initial requirement for any new aircraft equipment to be fitted. The standard is part of a long-term plan, called the Global Aeronautical Distress and Safety System (GADSS), which will require new aircraft to be equipped with data broadcast systems that are in constant contact with air traffic controllers. The GADSS is similar to the Global Maritime Distress and Safety System (GMDSS) used for maritime safety.

Aviation Safety Reporting System
The Aviation Safety Reporting System (ASRS) collects voluntarily submitted aviation safety incident/situation reports from pilots, controllers and others. The ASRS uses reports to identify system deficiencies, issue alert messages, and produce two publications, CALLBACK, and ASRS Directline. The collected information is made available to the public, and is used by the FAA, NASA and other organizations working in research and flight safety.

Statistics

Bureau of Aircraft Accidents Archives (B3A) 

The Bureau of Aircraft Accidents Archives (B3A), formerly known as the Aircraft Crashes Record Office (ACRO), a non-government organization based in Geneva, Switzerland, compiles statistics on aviation accidents of aircraft capable of carrying more than six passengers, excluding helicopters, balloons, and combat aircraft. Note that ACRO only considers crashes in which the aircraft has suffered such damage that it is removed from service, which will further reduce the statistics for incidents and fatalities compared to some other data. The total fatalities due to aviation accidents since 1970 is 83,772. The total number of incidents is 11,164.

According to ACRO, recent years have been considerably safer for aviation, with fewer than 170 incidents every year between 2009 and 2017, compared to as many as 226 as recently as 1998.

The annual fatalities figure is less than 1,000 for ten of the fourteen years between 2007 and 2020, the year 2017 experiencing the lowest number of fatalities, at 399, since the end of World War II.

2014 included the disappearance of flight MH370 over the Indian Ocean and the shootdown of flight MH17 as part of the war in Donbas. The total number of fatalities in 2014 was 1,328, 869 more than in 2013.

Deaths and incidents per year according to ACRO and Bureau of Aircraft Accident Archives data, :

(Data have significantly changed since November 2015 after a major upgrade to the death rate and crash rate web pages. This may reflect a change between a static and dynamic web page, where data were made to be automatically updated based on the incidents in their archives.)

Annual Aviation Safety Review (EASA)
The European Aviation Safety Agency (EASA) is tasked by Article 15(4) of Regulation (EC) No 216/2008 of the European Parliament and of the Council of February 20, 2008, to provide an annual review of aviation safety.

The Annual Safety Review presents statistics on European and worldwide civil aviation safety. Statistics are grouped according to type of operation, for instance, commercial air transport, and aircraft category, such as aeroplanes, helicopters, gliders, etc.
The Agency has access to accident and statistical information collected by the International Civil Aviation Organization (ICAO). States are required, according to ICAO Annex 13, on Aircraft Accident and Incident Investigation, to report to ICAO information, on accidents and serious incidents to aircraft with a maximum certificated take-off mass (MTOM) over 2250 kg. Therefore, most statistics in this review concern aircraft above this mass. In addition to the ICAO data, a request was made to the EASA Member States to obtain light aircraft accident data. Furthermore, data on the operation of aircraft for commercial air transport were obtained from both ICAO and the NLR Air Transport Safety Institute.

Investigation

Annex 13 of the Chicago Convention provides the international Standards And Recommended Practices that form the basis for air accident and incident investigations by signatory countries, as well as reporting and preventive measures.  The International Civil Aviation Organization (ICAO) is specifically focused on preventing accidents, rather than determining liability.

Australia
In Australia, the Australian Transport Safety Bureau is the federal government body responsible for investigating transport-related accidents and incidents, covering air, sea, and rail travel. Formerly an agency of the Department of Infrastructure, Transport, Regional Development and Local Government, in 2010, in the interests of keeping its independence it became a stand-alone agency.

Brazil
In Brazil, the Aeronautical Accidents Investigation and Prevention Center (CENIPA) was established under the auspices of the Aeronautical Accident Investigation and Prevention Center, a Military Organization of the Brazilian Air Force (FAB). The organization is responsible for the activities of aircraft accident prevention, and investigation of civil and military aviation occurrences.  Formed in 1971, and in accordance with international standards, CENIPA represented a new philosophy: investigations are conducted with the sole purpose of promoting the "prevention of aeronautical accidents".

Canada
In Canada, the Transportation Safety Board of Canada (TSB), is an independent agency responsible for the advancement of transportation safety through the investigation and reporting of accident and incident occurrences in all prevalent Canadian modes of transportation – marine, air, rail and pipeline.

China
In China, the Civil Aviation Administration of China (CAAC) is totally responsible for all air investigations and safety inside the country after the split from the formal CAAC Airlines.

Ethiopia
In Ethiopia, the Civil Aviation Accident Prevention and Investigation Bureau of the Ethiopian Civil Aviation Authority (ECAA), which is an agency of the Ministry of Transport and Communications, conducts aircraft accident investigations in Ethiopia or involving Ethiopian aircraft.

France
In France, the agency responsible for investigation of civilian air crashes is the Bureau d'Enquêtes et d'Analyses pour la Sécurité de l'Aviation Civile (BEA). Its purpose is to establish the circumstances and causes of the accident and to make recommendations for their future avoidance.

Germany
In Germany, the agency for investigating air crashes is the Federal Bureau of Aircraft Accidents Investigation (BFU). It is an agency of the Federal Ministry of Transport and Digital Infrastructure. The focus of the BFU is to improve safety by determining the causes of accidents and serious incidents and making safety recommendations to prevent recurrence.

Hong Kong
The Air Accident Investigation Authority (AAIA) is responsible for investigating civil aviation accidents in Hong Kong, as well as those in other territories involving a Hong Kong-registered aircraft. It is led by Darren Straker, Chief Inspector of Accidents, and headquartered at Hong Kong International Airport. AAIA was established in 2018 in response to an ICAO directive instructing that member states maintain air accident investigation authorities that are independent of civil aviation authorities and related entities. Prior to 2018, accident investigation duties were held by the Civil Aviation Department's Flight Standards & Airworthiness Division and Accident Investigation Division.

India 
Until May 30, 2012, the Directorate General of Civil Aviation investigated incidents involving aircraft. Since then, the Aircraft Accident Investigation Bureau has taken over investigation responsibilities.

Indonesia 
Its aim is the improvement of transportation safety, not just aviation, in Indonesia.

Italy
Created in 1999 in Italy, the Agenzia Nazionale per la Sicurezza del Volo (ANSV), has two main tasks: conducting technical investigations for civil aviation aircraft accidents and incidents, while issuing safety recommendations as appropriate; and conducting studies and surveys aimed at increasing flight safety. The organization is also responsible for establishing and maintaining the "voluntary reporting system."  Although not under the supervision of the Ministry of Infrastructure and Transport, the ANSV is a public authority under the oversight of the Presidency of the Council of Ministers of Italy.

Japan
The Japan Transport Safety Board investigates aviation accidents and incidents. The Aircraft Accident Investigation Commission investigated aviation accidents and incidents in Japan until October 1, 2001, when the Aircraft and Railway Accidents Investigation Commission (ARAIC) replaced it, and the ARAIC did this function until October 1, 2008, when it merged into the JTSB.

Malaysia 
Established in 2016, the Air Accident Investigation Bureau (AAIB) Malaysia is the main investigation body for aircraft accident/incident. Separate from Civil Aviation Authority of Malaysia (CAAM) and MAVCOM that is the national aviation authority and commission that oversee aviation economy respectively. The AAIB operates from the ministry of transport headquarters in Putrajaya, and its black box laboratory situated in STRIDE, the ministry of defenses research institute. AAIB Malaysia is teamed by civilians and seconded Royal Malaysian Airforce senior officer and a group of pool investigators from Malaysia Institute of Aviation Technology

Mexico
In Mexico, the Directorate General of Civil Aviation (DGAC) investigates aviation accidents.

Netherlands
In the Netherlands, the Dutch Safety Board (Onderzoeksraad voor Veiligheid) is responsible for the investigation of incidents and accidents, including air accidents. Its aim is the improvement of safety in the Netherlands. Its main focus is on those situations in which civilians are dependent on the government, companies or organizations for their safety. The Board solely investigates when incidents or accidents occur and aims to draw lessons from the results of these investigations. The Safety Board is objective, impartial and independent in its judgment. The Board will always be critical towards all parties concerned.

New Zealand
In New Zealand, the Transport Accident Investigation Commission (TAIC) is responsible for the investigation of air accidents. "The Commission's purpose, as set out in its Act, is to determine the circumstances and causes of aviation, rail and maritime accidents, and incidents, with a view to avoiding similar occurrences in the future, rather than to ascribe blame to any person." The TAeC will investigate with accordance with annex 13 of the ICAO.

Poland 
In Poland, State Commission on Aircraft Accidents Investigation (Polish: Państwowa Komisja Badania Wypadków Lotniczych, PKBWL) is responsible for investigating all civil aviation accidents and incidents occurring in the country. Headquartered in Warsaw, the commission is a division of the Ministry of Infrastructure. As of November 2022, the head of the PKBWL is Bogusław Trela.

Russia
In Russia, the Interstate Aviation Committee (IAC, MAK according to the original Russian name) is an executive body overseeing the use and management of civil aviation in the Commonwealth of Independent States. This organization investigates air accidents in the former USSR area under the umbrella of the Air Accident Investigation Commission of the Interstate Aviation Committee. There are active discussion to dismantling the committee, and in 2020, Armenia and Russia has signed on a joint agreement establishing the International Bureau for investigating aviation accidents and serious incidents (In Russian: Международное бюро по расследованию авиационных происшествий и серьезных инцидентов), designed to replace the committee and to act as upper body for investigation of aviation incidents and, subordinate to the Eurasian Union. The new body has been assigned duties to investigate serious accidents and incidents in accordance with the requirements of ICAO documents, ensuring independent investigation of accidents, cooperation and interaction between the parties in relation to investigating aircraft accidents, development and use of common rules and procedures for investigating aircraft accidents.

Taiwan
In Taiwan, the Aviation Safety Council (ASC) is the independent government agency that is responsible for aviation accident investigations. Established in 1998, ASC is under the administration of the Executive Yuan and independent from Civil Aeronautics Administration of Taiwan. The ASC consisted of five to seven board members, including a chairman and a vice chairman, appointed by the Premier. The managing director of ASC manages the day-to-day function of the organization, including accident investigations.

United Kingdom

In the United Kingdom, the agency responsible for investigation of civilian air crashes is the Air Accidents Investigation Branch (AAIB) of the Department for Transport. Its purpose is to establish the circumstances and causes of the accident and to make recommendations for their future avoidance.

United States
United States civil aviation incidents are investigated by the National Transportation Safety Board (NTSB). NTSB officials piece together evidence from the crash site to determine likely cause, or causes. The NTSB also investigates overseas incidents involving US-registered aircraft, in collaboration with local investigative authorities, especially when  significant loss of American lives occurs, or when the involved aircraft is American-built.

Retirement of flight numbers
Owing to superstition, it is common for an airline to cease using the flight number of a fatal crash. For example, following the shootdown of Malaysia Airlines Flight 17, the flight number was changed to MH19. However, that is not always the case. For example, China Southern Airlines continued using the flight number 3456 even after a fatal crash in 1997.

See also

 :Category:18th-century aviation accidents and incidents
 :Category:19th-century aviation accidents and incidents
 :Category:20th-century aviation accidents and incidents
 :Category:21st-century aviation accidents and incidents

By person(s) killed
 List of fatalities from aviation accidents
 List of heads of government and state who died in aviation accidents and incidents
 List of sole survivors of airline accidents or incidents

Lists of airliner accidents
 by year
 by airline
 by location
 in the United States

Types of accidents
 :Category:Aviation accidents and incidents by aircraft
 :Category:Aviation accidents and incidents by type
 Bird strike
 Controlled flight into terrain
 Fuel tank explosion
 List of accidents and incidents involving commercial aircraft
 List of accidents and incidents involving general aviation (including chartered / non-scheduled passenger flights)
 List of aircraft structural failures
 List of airship accidents
 Mid-air collision
 Pilot error
 Runway incursion
 Shootdown
 Uncontrolled decompression

Lists of military aircraft accidents
 List of accidents and incidents involving the Lockheed C-130 Hercules
 List of aviation accidents and incidents in the war in Afghanistan
 List of aviation shootdowns and accidents during the Iraq War
 List of aviation shootdowns and accidents during the Syrian Civil War
 Lists of accidents and incidents involving military aircraft

Aviation safety
 Aviation archaeology
 Aviation safety

Aviation authorities
 Agência Nacional de Aviação Civil (ANAC, Brazil)
 Civil Aviation Administration of China (CAAC, China)
 Civil Aviation Authority of New Zealand (CAA, NZ)
 Civil Aviation Authority (United Kingdom) (CAA, UK)
 Civil Aviation Safety Authority (CASA, Australia)
 Directorate General for Civil Aviation (France) (DGAC, France)
 Directorate General of Civil Aviation (DGCA, India)
 European Aviation Safety Agency (EASA)
 Federal Aviation Administration (FAA, United States)
 International Civil Aviation Organization (ICAO)
 Italian Civil Aviation Authority (ENAC, Italy)
 Luftfahrt-Bundesamt (LBA, Germany)
 Pakistan Civil Aviation Authority (CAA, Pakistan)
 Transport Canada (TC, Canada)

Other
 Accident analysis
 Aircraft hijacking
 Disaster
 Flight 191 (disambiguation)
 Flight 901 (disambiguation)
 List of air show accidents and incidents in the 20th century
 List of news aircraft accidents and incidents
 List of spaceflight-related accidents and incidents
 Civil aviation authority
 Skydiving regulation in the United States
 Talk-down aircraft landing
 Aviation accidents and incidents involving crashes with less then 100 deaths

Notes

References

Bibliography

 KLu Crash Archief; Ongevallenfoto's 1945 – 1965, 'Flash Aviation', 2003.
 KLu Crash Archief 2; Ongevallenfoto's 1964 – 1974, 'Flash Aviation', 2004.
 BLu Crash Archief; Ongevallenfoto's 1945 – 1965, 'Flash Aviation', 2004.

 USAF & NATO Report RTO-TR-015 AC/323/(HFM-015)/TP-1 (2001).

Further reading
 
Airbus Industrie. Commercial Aviation Accidents, 1958–2014: A Statistical Analysis. Blagnac Cedex, France: Airbus, 2015 13p.
 Bordoni, Antonio. Airlife's Register Of Aircraft Accidents: Facts, Statistics and Analysis of Civil Accidents since 1951. Shrewsbury: Airlife, 1997  401p.
 S A Cullen MD FRCPath FRAeS. "Injuries in Fatal Aircraft Accidents" (Archive). NATO.

External links

 Aviation Safety Network Established in 1996. The ASN Safety Database contains descriptions of over 15800 airliner, military and corporate jet aircraft accidents/incidents since 1921.
 Bureau of Aircraft Accidents Archives Established in 2000. The B3A contains descriptions of over 22,000 airliner, military and corporate jet aircraft accidents since 1918.
 National Transportation Safety Board Aviation Accident Synopses – by month
 Aviation Statistics Statistical and geospatial analysis of general aviation accidents.
 Aviation Accidents App Access the NTSB Aviation Accidents Database and Final Reports from all over the world on your mobile device

 
Aviation safety
History of aviation